Eisenhower Middle School may refer to:

 Eisenhower Middle School (San Antonio, Texas)
 Eisenhower Middle School (Topeka, Kansas)
 Eisenhower Middle School (Liberal, Kansas)
 Eisenhower Middle School (Wyckoff, New Jersey)
 Eisenhower Middle School (Succasunna, New Jersey)
 Eisenhower Middle School (Albuquerque, New Mexico)
 Eisenhower Middle School (Rockford, Illinois)
 Eisenhower Middle School (Freehold, New Jersey)
 Eisenhower Middle School (Everett, Washington)
 Eisenhower Middle School (Kansas City, Kansas)
 Eisenhower Middle School (Laurel, Maryland)
 Eisenhower Middle School (Gibsonton, Florida)